Lipscani is a street and a district of Bucharest, Romania, which from the Middle Ages to the early 19th century was the most important commercial area of the city and  Wallachia. It is located near the ruins of the old Princely Court built by Vlad III the Impaler.

History
It was named after Leipzig (Lipsca in 17th century Romanian), as that was the origin of many of the wares that could be found on the main street. The word lipscan (singular of lipscani) meant trader who brought his wares from Western Europe.

All trades were found in the area, including goldsmiths, hatters, shoemakers, tanners, saddlemakers, etc., many guilds (or isnafuri) having their own street: even nowadays, the nearby streets bear the name of a trade (Blănari = Furriers street, Șelari = Saddlemakers street, etc.).

During the Communist period, the whole area was scheduled to be demolished, but this never came to fruition. The district became neglected, but nowadays is the most attractive area for tourists of all Bucharest. As of 2013, many of the buildings were restored. In the early 21st century, much of the district has been transformed into a pedestrian zone.

Known mainly for its restaurants and bars, including the Caru' cu Bere, a few shops, that feel out of place such as H&M, Adidas and Yves Rocher, have begun to appear in the area, slowly turning Lipscani into a commercial shopping district as well. One should pay attention to the architecture, the mix of neglected buildings and coquette facades  but also to the uneven pavement. Even without high heels one risks to trip.

See also
Bucharest Old Town

References

Districts of Bucharest
Streets in Bucharest
Historic monuments in Bucharest
Pedestrian malls
Lipscani